The 1901 Arizona football team was an American football team that represented the University of Arizona as an independent during the 1901 college football season. In their second and final season under head coach William W. Skinner, the team compiled a 4–1 record and outscored their opponents, 115 to 19. All five games were played against the Tucson and Phoenix Indian Schools. The team captain was Leslie Gillett.

Schedule

References

Arizona
Arizona Wildcats football seasons
Arizona football